Crosby is an unincorporated community in Kitsap County, in the U.S. state of Washington.

History
A post office called Crosby was in operation between 1891 and 1918. The community's name is a transfer from Crosby, England.

References

Unincorporated communities in Kitsap County, Washington
Unincorporated communities in Washington (state)